The 2019–20 Feyenoord Basketball season was the 66th season in the existence of the club. The club played in the Dutch Basketball League (DBL) and NBB Cup. The season was cancelled in March due to the COVID-19 pandemic.

It was the second season the team was known as Feyenoord Basketball and the first season under head coach Toon van Helfteren. On 15 April 2019, Van Helfteren signed a two-year contract with Feyenoord.

This season the team was named Zeeuw & Zeeuw Feyenoord for sponsorship reasons.

Players

Squad information

Depth chart

Transactions

In 

|}

Out 

|}

Pre-season
Feyenoord began its pre-season on 26 August 2019.

Dutch Basketball League

Regular season

References

External links
 Official website

Feyenoord
Feyenoord
Feyenoord Basketball seasons